Jack Jordan is an American politician serving as a member of the Indiana House of Representatives for the 17th district. He assumed office on November 9, 2016.

Education 
Jordan graduated from Bremen High School in 1979. He studied industrial management at Purdue University for one year and earned a Bachelor of Science from Liberty University in 1984.

Career 
In 2016, Jordan was elected for the 17th district of the Indiana House of Representatives, succeeding Timothy Harman. He assumed office on November 9, 2016.

References 

Living people
Place of birth missing (living people)
Year of birth missing (living people)
Republican Party members of the Indiana House of Representatives
21st-century American politicians
Purdue University alumni
Liberty University alumni